Ernest Neuhard (22 November 1903 – 10 September 1980) was a French racing cyclist. He finished in last place in the 1933 Tour de France.

References

External links
 

1903 births
1980 deaths
French male cyclists
Sportspeople from Troyes
Cyclists from Grand Est